Premio Lo Nuestro 2009 was held on Thursday March 26, 2009 at the BankUnited Center at the University of Miami in Coral Gables, Florida. It is broadcast live by Univision Network. The nominees were announced on Wednesday January 14, 2009 during a live televised morning show Despierta América! on Univision Network.

The show featured a short speech in both English and Spanish by U.S. president Barack Obama, the first time since his 2008 election campaign in which he utilized the Spanish language for a mass audience.

Hosts
 Eugenio Derbez
 Ninel Conde

Performers
01. — Wisin & Yandel — "Me Estas Tentando" — 04:00
02. — Gloria Trevi Along With Los Horóscopos de Durango — "Cinco Mintuos" — 03:36
03. — Luis Fonsi, Aleks Syntek, Noel Schajris & David Bisbal — "No Me Doy Por Vencido / Aquí Estoy Yo" — 05:36
04. — El Chapo De Sinaloa
05. — Enrique Iglesias Along With Wisin & Yandel — "Llóro Por Tí" — 04:04
06. — Alejandra Guzmán Along With Camila — "Hacer Él Amor Con Orto / Así Es A Final / Tú Eres Mi Luz" — 06:41
07. — Flex And Pee Wee — "Dime Si Te Vas Con Él" — 03:30
08. — Franco De Vita Along With K-Paz de la Sierra
09. — Reik
10. — Aventura — "Por Un Segundo" — 03:39
11. — Emmanuel
12. — Víctor Manuelle
13. — La Arrolladora Banda El Limón
14. — Fanny Lu
15. — NG2 Feat. Gilberto Santa Rosa — "Ella Menea" — 03:49

Presenters
 Jorge Salinas
 Grupo Montéz de Durango
 Alessandra Rosaldo
 Angélica Vale
 Jenni Rivera
 Christopher Uckermann
 Christian Chávez
 Cristián de la Fuente
 Diana Reyes
 Alexandra Cheron
 MJ
 Silvia Pinal
 Los Horóscopos de Durango
 Lorena Herrera
 Camila
 Yuridia
 José Ángel Llamas
 Elizabeth Álvarez
 Pablo Montero
 Tommy Torres
 Eiza ("Lola")
 Pee Wee
 Gloria Trevi
 Juanes
 Gilberto Santa Rosa
 Scarlet Ortiz
 Alexis & Fido
 Elvis Crespo
 Olga Tañón
 Alacranes Musical
 Wilmer Valderrama (Guest Appearance)

Special awards

Premio Lo Nuestro a la Excelencia (Lifetime Achievement Award)
Emmanuel

Trayectoria Artist of the Year
Alejandra Guzmán

Awards (winners in bold)

Pop

Album of the Year
 95/08 Exitos - Enrique Iglesias
 Empezar Desde Cero - RBD
 Entre Mariposas - Yuridia
 Fuerza - Alejandra Guzmán
 Tarde o Temprano - Tommy Torres

Male Artist
 Alejandro Fernández
 Chayanne
 Enrique Iglesias
 Luis Fonsi
 Tommy Torres

Female Artist
 Alejandra Guzmán
 Gloria Trevi
 Julieta Venegas
 Kany García
 Yuridia

Group or Duo
 Belanova
 Camila
 Jesse & Joy
 RBD
 Reik

Breakout Artist or Group of the Year
 Ana Isabelle
 Eiza ("Lola")
 Juan
 La Nueva Banda Timbiriche
 Playa Limbo

Song of the Year
 "Ahora Entendí" - Yuridia
 "Cada Que..." - Belanova
 "¿Dónde Están Corazón?" - Enrique Iglesias
 "Inalcanzable" - RBD
 "Soy Solo Un Secreto" - Alejandra Guzmán

Rock

Album of the Year
 17 - Motel
 La Vida... Es un Ratico - Juanes
 Arde El Cielo - Maná
 Mucho - Babasónicos
 Sino - Café Tacuba

Artist of the Year
 Black Guayaba
 Café Tacuba
 Juanes
 Maná
 Motel

Song of the Year
 "Arde el Cielo" - Maná
 "Gotas de Agua Dulce" - Juanes
 "Me Enamora" - Juanes
 "Si No Te Hubieras Ido" - Maná
 "Tres" - Juanes

Tropical

Album of the Year
 Contraste - Gilberto Santa Rosa
 Con Todas Las de Ganar - NG2
 Kings of Bachata: Sold Out at Madison Square Garden - Aventura
 La Nueva Escuela Nu School - N'Klabe
 Soy - Víctor Manuelle

Male Artist of the Year
 Frank Reyes
 Gilberto Santa Rosa
 Juan Luis Guerra
 Marc Anthony
 Víctor Manuelle

Female Artist of the Year
 Fanny Lu
 Gloria Estefan
 Milly Quezada
 Olga Tañón

Group or Duo of the Year
 Aventura
 DLG
 NG2
 N'Klabe
 Xtreme featuring Adrienne Bailon

Song of the Year
 "Como Yo" - Juan Luis Guerra
 "Conteo Regresivo" - Gilberto Santa Rosa
 "El Perdedor" - Aventura
 "Ella Menea" - NG2
 "No Te Vayas" - Gilberto Santa Rosa

Merengue Artist of the Year
 Elvis Crespo
 Juan Luis Guerra
 Los Hermanos Rosario
 Olga Tañón
 Raul Acosta and Oro Solido

Tropical Salsa Artist of the Year
 Gilberto Santa Rosa
 Marc Anthony
 NG2
 N'Klabe
 Víctor Manuelle

Tropical Traditional Artist of the Year
 Andy Andy
 Aventura
 Fonseca
 Frank Reyes
 Héctor Acosta

Regional Mexican Music

Album of the Year
 Y Que Quede Claro - La Arrolladora Banda El Limón
 Capaz de Todo Por Tí - K-Paz de la Sierra
 Con Banda - Los Dareyes de la Sierra
 La Historia - El Chapo de Sinaloa
 Que Bonito…Es Lo Bonito - Banda el Recodo

Male Artist of the Year
 El Chapo de Sinaloa
 El Potro de Sinaloa
 Fidel Rueda
 Marco Antonio Solís
 Vicente Fernández

Female Artist of the Year
 Diana Reyes
 Graciela Beltrán
 Isabela
 Jenni Rivera

Group or Duo of the Year
 Alacranes Musical
 Conjunto Primavera
 Montez de Durango
 La Arrolladora Banda El Limón
 Los Creadorez del Pasito Duranguense de Alfredo Ramírez

Breakout Artist or Group of the Year
 AK-7
 Aliados de la Sierra
 Germán Montero
 Los Pikadientes de Caborca
 Uranio

Song of the Year
 "Hasta el Día de Hoy" - Los Dareyes de la Sierra
 "Si Te Agarran Las Ganas" - El Chapo de Sinaloa
 "Sobre Mis Pies" - La Arrolladora Banda El Limón
 "Te Lloré" - Conjunto Primavera
 "Un Buen Perdedor" - K-Paz de la Sierra with Franco De Vita

Banda of the Year
 El Chapo de Sinaloa
 El Potro de Sinaloa
 Jenni Rivera
 La Arrolladora Banda El Limón
 Los Dareyes de la Sierra

Duranguense Artist of the Year
 Alacranes Musical
 Montez de Durango
 K-Paz de la Sierra
 Los Creadorez del Pasito Duranguense de Alfredo Ramírez
 Patrulla 81

Grupera Artist of the Year
 Bronco El Gigante de América
 Control
 Grupo Bryndis
 Los Temerarios
 Marco Antonio Solís

Norteño Artist of the Year
 Conjunto Primavera
 Intocable
 Linderos del Norte
 Los Rieleros del Norte
 Los Tigres del Norte

Ranchera Artist of the Year
 Pedro Fernández
 Pepe Aguilar
 Vicente Fernández

Urban

Album of the Year
 King of Kings Live - Don Omar
 Wisin vs. Yandel: Los Extraterrestres - Wisin & Yandel
 Showtime - Angel & Khriz
 Sobrenatural - Alexis & Fido
 Te Quiero - Flex

Artist of the Year
 Alexis & Fido
 Daddy Yankee
 Don Omar
 Flex
 Wisin & Yandel

Song of the Year
 "Ahora Es" - Wisin & Yandel
 "He Venido" - MJ
 "Sexy Movimiento" - Wisin & Yandel
 "Te Quiero" - Flex
 "Ya No Llores" - Baby Boy

Video of the Year
 La Novela - Akwid
 Pose - Daddy Yankee
 Tu Adiós No Mata - Intocable
 Un Beso de Desayuno - Calle 13
 Visible - Jaguares

References

Lo Nuestro Awards by year
2009 music awards
2009 in Florida
2009 in Latin music
Events in Coral Gables, Florida